Miguel Mancera Aguayo (born December 18, 1932) is a Mexican economist. He served as general director of the Bank of Mexico from 1982 until 1998.

Mancera Aguayo was born in Mexico City, and is the son of Rafael Mancera Ortiz and María Luisa Aguayo Cendejas. He received a bachelor's degree in economics from the Instituto Tecnológico Autónomo de México (ITAM) and a master's degree in economics from Yale University.

Before joining the public sector, Mancera worked at the Bank of Commerce (nowadays BBVA Bancomer, 1953 – 1955) and taught several courses at the Escuela Libre de Derecho (1956 – 1957). He was also a member of the faculty of the ITAM (1958 – 1965) and the Latin American Center of Monetary Studies (CEMLA, 1962 – 1964).

He joined the Mexican central bank (Banxico) in 1957 and 25 years later was appointed general director by President Miguel de la Madrid. During the 1980s, he faced one of the toughest economic crises in the history of Mexico and in the early 1990s he launched a new national currency, the Mexican Nuevo Peso.

Mancera is married to Sonia Corcuera Corcuera. He received the Order of Rio Branco (Brazil, 1983) and he is an officer of the French Légion d'honneur (1990).

References

1932 births
Living people
Mexican economists
Heads of Bank of Mexico
Instituto Tecnológico Autónomo de México alumni
Yale University alumni
People from Mexico City
Academic staff of Escuela Libre de Derecho